Siam is the former name of Thailand, and is used to refer to the historical region of Central Thailand, usually including Southern Thailand.

Siam or SIAM may also refer to:

Places
Siam, Ohio, an unincorporated community in the United States
Siam area, area in the Pathum Wan district of Bangkok, Thailand
Siam BTS Station, rail station which serves this area
Rue de Siam or Siam Street, a street in Brest, France

Historical kingdoms
Sukhothai Kingdom (1238-1438), a kingdom in what is now north central Thailand that eventually merged with Ayutthaya
Ayutthaya Kingdom (1350-1767), a Siamese kingdom centered on the city of Ayutthaya
Thonburi Kingdom (1767-1782), a kingdom with its capital in Thonburi, which is now part of Bangkok
Rattanakosin Kingdom (1782–1932), a kingdom in Thailand until the Siamese revolution

SIAM

Salón Internacional del Automóvil México, an annual auto show in Mexico City
Service integration and management, an information technology management framework
Society for Industrial and Applied Mathematics (SIAM), an academic society

Other uses
Siam (name), a surname and given name, including notable people with the name
Siam (duo), a Colombian musical duo
Siam (album), their debut album

See also
Siamese (disambiguation)
Sjam (disambiguation)
Syam (disambiguation)
History of Thailand